Jamie Johnson (born January 23, 1982) is a Canadian former professional ice hockey player. He last played for Herning Blue Fox of the Danish Metal Ligaen.

Early life 
Johnson was born in Port Franks, Ontario. He played junior hockey with the Sarnia Sting and the Oshawa Generals in the Ontario Hockey League. Johnson made his professional debut in the ECHL with the Louisiana IceGators in the 2003–04 season.

Career 
On July 6, 2010, Johnson was signed as a free agent by the Detroit Red Wings. On July 18, 2012, after a strong season in the American Hockey League with the Grand Rapids Griffins, Johnson signaled his intent to return to Europe in signing a two-year contract with Dinamo Riga of the Kontinental Hockey League. 

Following his retirement in the spring of 2017, Johnson became an assistant coach for the Ontario Tech Ridgebacks or the 2017–18 season. He also the co-owner and director of the skating skills clinic Scary Skate.

References

External links

1982 births
Living people
Albany River Rats players
Augusta Lynx players
Bridgeport Sound Tigers players
Dinamo Riga players
Grand Rapids Griffins players
Hershey Bears players
Iowa Stars players
Kölner Haie players
Louisiana IceGators (ECHL) players
Oshawa Generals players
Rochester Americans players
Sarnia Sting players
HC TPS players
Vienna Capitals players
Canadian expatriate ice hockey players in Austria
Canadian expatriate ice hockey players in Latvia
Canadian expatriate ice hockey players in Finland
Canadian expatriate ice hockey players in Germany
Canadian ice hockey centres